The 2017 Rally Catalunya was the eleventh round of the 2017 World Rally Championship and was the 53rd running of the Rally de España. The rally was won by Kris Meeke and Paul Nagle, their fifth win in the World Rally Championship and first win on tarmac.

Teemu Suninen and Mikko Markkula won the WRC-2 category, their first win of the season.

Entry list

Classification

Event standings

Special stages

Power Stage
The Power Stage was a  stage at the end of the rally.

Championship standings after the rally

Drivers' Championship standings

Manufacturers' Championship standings

References

External links
 The official website of the World Rally Championship

2017 World Rally Championship season
2017
2017 in Spanish motorsport
2017 in Catalan sport
October 2017 sports events in Spain